is an anime television series begun in 1993, created by Takara and Sunrise under the direction of Shinji Takamatsu, and was the fourth in the Yūsha or Brave metaseries.

Story
Mighto Senpuuji is a billionaire crime-fighting teenager, taking up his father's company and assets at the age of only 15. Taking control of the Might Gaine team of robots that his late father created, Senpuuji and his free thinking robot teams take on the crime lords that plague Nouvelle Tokyo City.

Characters

Heroes
 
 Voiced by Nobuyuki Hiyama
He pilots the Might Wing, Might Kaiser, and both Might Gaine and Great Might Gaine both with the assistance of Gaine. Whenever villains cause trouble, he is the one who stops their plans. His parents were killed three years ago in a serious bullet train accident.

 
 Voiced by Masami Kikuchi
 A friend of Maito and a mechanic, he is the one who helped designing the Bombers.

 
 Voiced by Akiko Yajima
 A high school student who tends to get involved in the crimes committed by the villains with no reason, but Maito always comes to rescue her. They get to know each other because of that. She becomes the girlfriend of Maito during the course of the series. Her little brother, Tetsuya, idolizes Might Gaine. Her father is severely ill, so she must take up part-time jobs to sustain the family. At the end of the series, Sally and Mighto eventually get married.

 
 Voiced by Kazuhiko Kishino
 Mighto's butler and father figure throughout the series.

 
 Voiced by Yuri Amano
 Mighto's secretary and elder sister figure throughout the series.

Villains
 
 Voiced by Masaharu Satō
 A German professor of robot technology, he holds the ambition that makes the strongest robot in the world. Hiryu and Goryu are his products.

 
 Voiced by Yū Shimaka
 A don of the Asian Mafia from China, Lou is easily recognizable due to his large, bump-covered nose and a loud green bird perched on his shoulder. He sells various robots to the highest bidder in order to commit crimes. After losing control over the Mafia due to Purple's intervention, he ends up selling ramen.

 
 Voiced by Shōko Kanoki (Anime), Yuriko Fuchizaki (Super Robot Wars V)
 A French woman, a boss of "Pink Cat" the confederacy of thieves. To keep her beauty, she often steals the jewel and the adornment for her desire.

 
 Voiced by Kiyoyuki Yanada
 An American who is dressed in Samurai style. He plots to reconquer all of Japan, to regain an old-fashioned, traditional Japanese culture.

 
 Voiced by Hikaru Midorikawa
 The rival of Maito, also well known as "Joe the Ace". He used to be an ace pilot in the army.

 
 A rock star who works for Black Noir. He pretended to be part of the Chinese Mafia before he disbanded it and sent all its resources to Black Noir.

 Exev
 Voiced by Masashi Sugawara
 CEO of Treasure robotics. He was once a normal man before Black Noir mutated him.

Brave Express Team

Might Gaine
 (Voiced by Daiki Nakamura) - Great Might Gaine's final form with Might Gunner forming a shoulder-mounted cannon.
 (Voiced by Daiki Nakamura) - The combined robot of both Might Gaine and Might Kaiser.
 (Voiced by Daiki Nakamura) - The combined robot of the Might Wing, Gaine and the Locomorizer. This is the series' main mecha.
 - Maito's jet. It also has a train mode (400 Series Shinkansen). The Might Wing becomes the right arm of Might Gaine when combined with Gaine and the Locomorizer.
 (Voiced by Daiki Nakamura) - A super artificially intelligent robot with the ability to transform into a train (300 Series Shinkansen). Gaine becomes the left arm of Might Gaine when combined with the Might Wing and the Locomorizer. When Maito pilots Might Kaiser, Gaine's AI takes control of Might Gaine.
 - A large steam locomotive. It becomes the core component of Might Gaine, forming the torso, the legs and the head when combined with the Might Wing and Gaine. It can also expand its rear section to carry the train modes of Gaine and the Might Wing.
 - Two alternate combinations (robot mode or jet mode) of the Kaiser Machines 1–5, the Kaiser Drill and the Kaiser Carrier, piloted by Maito. It forms the body additions of Great Might Gaine. This is the series' secondary main mecha.
 - This is the combined train form of the Kaiser Drill and Kaiser Carrier.
 - A drill locomotive that pulls the Kaiser Carrier, piloted by Maito. When forming Might Kaiser with the Kaiser Machines, it forms the torso, the head and the thighs.
 - A railroad car that carries the Kaiser Machines. It is pulled by Kaiser Drill. Kaiser Carrier also holds the wings and chest emblem of Might Kaiser. 
 - Numbered 1 to 5, initially stored in the Kaiser Carrier. Kaiser 1 is a very light jet that becomes the breastplate of Might Kaiser. Kaiser 2 is a drill vehicle that becomes the right arm of Might Kaiser. Kaiser 3 is a mobile crane that becomes the left arm of Might Kaiser. Kaiser 4 is a deep-sea exploration vehicle that becomes the right leg of Might Kaiser. Kaiser 5 is a bulldozer that becomes the left leg of Might Kaiser.
 (Voiced by Katsumi Suzuki) - A robot that can transform into a steam locomotive (as the Bullet Express) or a cannon (as the Perfect Cannon). The cannon component is Might Gunner's chest when in robot mode. He becomes a shoulder-mounted cannon for Great Might Gaine Perfect Mode.

The Bombers are a group of artificially intelligent robots, each capable of transforming into a robot, a train, an animal they are designed after, and an alternate armored version of a train. The first three or all four of the Bombers, in their armored train forms, are known as the  when linked together. The typical order is Lio Bomber > Dino Bomber > Bird Bomber (> Horn Bomber).

 (Voiced by Naoki Makishima) - Super robot formed by all the Bombers. It has a lion head extending from a neck as an ornament on its chest.
 (Voiced by Naoki Makishima) - Super robot formed by Lio Bomber, Bird Bomber and Dino Bomber. It has a more traditional robot head.
 (Voiced by Naoki Makishima) - He can transform into a robot, a train ((200 Series Type 2000 Shinkansen)) and a lion.  When forming Tribomber or Battle Bomber, Lio Bomber becomes the torso and the head.
 (Voiced by Masami Kikuchi) - He can transform into a robot, a train (Narita Express) and a bird.  When forming Tribomber or Battle Bomber, Bird Bomber becomes the left side of the combination, forming the arm, the waist and the leg.
 (Voiced by Hirohiko Kakegawa) - He can transform into a robot, a train (Hitachi (Japanese train)) and a Tyrannosaurus Rex. When forming Tribomber or Battle Bomber, Dino Bomber becomes the right side of the combination, forming the arm, the waist and the leg.
 (Voiced by Naoki Makishima) - The leader of the Bombers.  He can transform into a robot, a train (100 Series Shinkansen) and a Triceratops.  When forming Battle Bomber, Horn Bomber becomes the head, breastplate, a shoulder cannon and wings.

The Divers are a group of artificially intelligent robots designed for rescue purposes.

 (Voiced by Ryōtarō Okiayu) - Two combinations formed by the four Divers. Guard Diver is a super robot, and the Rescue Express is a combined super bullet train (SNCF TGV Sud-Est).
 (Voiced by Ryōtarō Okiayu) - The leader of the Divers.  He can transform into a fire truck.  When combined with the other Divers to form Guard Diver, Fire Diver forms the arms, upper torso and head.
 (Voiced by Naoki Makishima) - He can transform into a police car.  When combined with the other Divers to form Guard Diver, Police Diver forms the lower torso, the waist and the upper legs.
 (Voiced by Masami Kikuchi) - He can transform into a jet.  When combined with the other Divers to form Guard Diver, Jet Diver forms the right lower leg.
 (Voiced by Hirohiko Kakegawa) - He can transform into a drill.  When combined with the other Divers to form Guard Diver, Drill Diver forms the left lower leg.

The entire team can link into a single train. The order of the Brave Express is Drill Express (carrying Kaisers 1–5) > Locomorizer (carrying Gaine and Might Wing) > Bullet Express > Animal Express(all four) > Rescue Express.  At full speed, the trains can perform the Joint Dragon Fire attack, which engulfs the whole train in fire while rushing at full speed.

Underworld Mecha
The various mecha that have been used by the crime Underworld to fight Might Gaine and the other members of the Brave Express throughout the series.

Ether 5656: Appears in episode 1. Powers include a plug in the right arm that absorbs electricity, a mouth flamethrower, and torso missile pods.
Paozuu: Appear in episode 2. Powers include assimilating with metals to grow and regenerate, foot wheels, and a pair of machine guns in the mouth of the front head.
Kengo: Appears in episode 3. Powers include a katana and flight.
Hamoloon: Appears in episode 4. Powers include a nose drill, treads, spiked fingers, and iron mice in the torso.
Churenpai: Appear in episode 5. Powers include foot treads, a right shoulder missile cannon, a machine gun, and a knife in the right arm. They heavily resemble armored troopers from Armored Trooper VOTOMS.
Probebot: Appears in episode 6. Powers include a flamethrower for the left arm and a missile pod in each shoulder.
Trainingbot: Appear in episode 6. Its only known power is a pistol.
Panzer CR-17: Appears in episode 6. Powers include projectile resistant armor and a pistol.
Yakko: Appears in episode 7. Powers include levitation, an underside eye-like heat cannon, an electric field, two projectile resistant capture cables, and a robot form.
Fromage: Appears is episode 8. Powers include spiked claws, a spiked wrecking ball in the torso called the Special Diamond Attack, and heat lasers from the anteater-like mouth.
Train Bomb: Appears in episode 9. Powers include train hijacking, exploding if it goes below 45 kilometers an hour, homing rocket turrets, and a robotic upper half disguised as Ma-Bo-Jyan's blimp armed with propellers for arms.
Ninja: Appears in episode 10. Powers include a launchable chain for the right hand armed with missile pods, a sickle and spear for the left hand, a flamethrower in the "mouth", and agility.
Hiryu: Appears in episodes 11, 13, 14, 23, and 24. The design was originally from Transformers Zone's Sonic Bomber. Powers include a super sonic jet mode armed with a powerful laser cannon and wing missiles, flight, a spear with a pair of ax blades near the tip, martial arts skills, an energy gun that rivals the Moving Wheel Sword called the Hiryu Blazer, and five missiles in each leg. Reappears in both Brave Saga games.
Mega Sonic 8823: Appears in episode 11. Powers include flight, a 4-tube missile launcher on each shoulder, three homing rockets on each hip plate, and a radiation gun on the right arm. Also based on Sonic Bomber.
Mylenes: Appear in episodes 12 and 36. Powers include flight, a pair of machine guns on the head, a vacuum used to steal jewelry, sonic waves from the end of the abdomen, tracking missiles, reformation, and combining into Milenian.
Milenian: Appears in episode 12. Powers include sonic waves from the top of the thorax and flight.
Assassinbot: Appears in episode 13. Its only known power is a machine gun on each pectoral.
Death Fire: Appears in episode 13. Its only known power is a large Winchester rifle.
Chivalry Robot: Appears in episode 14. Powers include foot treads and a katana.
Gang Robot: Appears in episode 14. Powers include foot treads and a tommy gun.
Karate: Appears in episode 15. Powers include karate skills and projectile resistance.
Black Gaine (Voiced by Yasunori Matsumoto) : Appears in episode 16. An attempt to make an evil clone of Gaine, but Hoi Kow Loon accidentally copied the goodness in Gaine's heart.
Black Might Wing: Appears in episode 16. Operated by Chinja.
Black Locomorizer: Appears in episode 16.
Black Pilder: Appears in episode 16. Its purpose was to control Black Gaine through a mask.
Black Might Gaine (Voiced by Yasunori Matsumoto) : Appears in episode 16. Controlled jointly by Hoi and Chinja. The cockpit being inserted into Black Might Gaine's head is a homage to Mazinger Z when the Hover Pilder combines into Mazinger Z's head.
Gunger: Appears in episode 16. Powers include a 5-tube missile launcher on each shoulder, a pair of machine guns for the right arm, a torso flamethrower, and spider-like robotic probes.
Mars 1133: Appears in episode 17. Powers include a 4-barreled gatling in each pectoral and claw hands.
Stark 4126: Appears in episode 17. Powers include a 3-tube missile launcher in the torso, clamp hands, a red energy cannon in the forehead, levitation, and foot spikes for walking at various angles.
Kruta: Appears in episode 18. Powers include a chainsaw arm, a pair of shovel claw arms, a claw crane arm, a drill arm, an underside drill, bombs, a machine gun, four red electric tentacle arms, a rocket launcher, a pair of lightning bolt rods, four cannons, and a chained mace.
Octopussy: Appears in episode 18. Powers include flight, six extensible tentacles with regenerative properties, and six energy cannons in the head.
Ashura: Appears in episode 19. Powers include a helicopter mode, six launchable arms, three flamethrowers and yellow lasers in its rotating head, levitation, and a resistance to heat.
Cool Mint 3636 Sentry 1: Appears in episode 21. Its only known power is having five missile launchers in the torso.
Cool Mint 3636 Sentry 2: Appears in episode 21. Its only known power is having a 3-tube missile pod in each side of its torso.
Cool Mint 3636: Appears in episode 21. Powers include a truck form, a pair of machine guns in each wrist, a gunk gun ob the torso that jams electronic signals, a night vision system, and a tomahawk stored on the back.
Red Shaomai: Appears in episode 22. Powers include an automatic rifle and a Chinese sword.
Blue Shaomai: Appears in episode 22. Powers include an automatic rifle and a Chinese sword.
Krappe 4545: Appears in episode 23. Powers include a pair of crab claws and a pair of cannons on the head.
Lenglen Issue: Appear in episode 25. Powers include burrowing, seven machine guns in the torso, and combining into a brick-like dragon with eye electric bolts and burrowing.
Lingling Issue: Appear in episode 25. Powers include an electrical cannon and combining into a robot armed with a red energy cannon on each shoulder.
Dark Wind Robo: Appears in episode 26. Powers include a ninjato, high jumping, shurikens, and interference resistance.
Magic Wind Robo: Appears in episode 26. Powers include cutting wires from the fingers, high jumping, and interference resistance.
Mystic Wind Robo: Appears in episode 26. Powers include a club, melee resistant armor, a saucer-like buzzsaw mode, and interference resistance.
Goryu: Appears throughout the series starting in episode 26. The design was originally from Transformers Zone's Dai Atlas. Powers include flight, speed, rocket punches attacked to chains and each armed with several gatling guns, transforming into a jet armed with a drill missile at the nose, an energy rifle stored in the right leg called the Goryu Cannon, a vulcan gun on each side of its head, and four missile pods in its torso. Reappears in both Brave Saga games.
Nio: Appears in episode 28. Powers include a spear, twin white electric cloths from its helmet, and a 6-tube missile pod in the torso.
Sunobi: Appears in episode 29. Powers include swimming, converting sea water into ice blocks, flight, emitting heat waves by absorbing solar energy, three vulcan guns on each side of its head, ice bombs from the beak, and a green laser gun in each wing.
Guyaton: Appears in episode 30. Powers include disguising itself as a blimp, a green energy cannon on each hip each armed with pincer claw half, and a large pincer claw on the head armed with pink electric bolts.
Telecaster: Appears in episode 31. Powers include a tomahawk, a pair of energy guns in the torso with four hidden in the abdomen, and an electric wire in the left wrist.
Stratocaster: Appears in episode 31. Powers include a pair of energy guns in the torso, an electric wire in the left wrist, a pair of curved swords on the forearms, and missile launchers in the shoulders.
Doraitsuen 1313: Appears in episode 32. Powers include a pair of missile launchers in each shoulder, flight, five tentacles from the right arm that emit pink electricity, and a missile pod in each hip and knee.
Arson: Appears in episode 33. Powers include levitation, a magnet in the underside, nose missiles, and a mouth drill.
Rickenbacker: Appear in episode 34. Powers include helicopter blades in the head, a shield on the right shoulder, a machine gun for the left hand, and shoulder rocket launchers.
Pumpkin: Appears in episode 36. Powers include flight, emitting seeds of giant pumpkin plants armed with destructive vines, a long bladed scythe, yellow eye beams, and finger machine guns. Reappears in Brave Saga.
Kochou: Appears in episode 37. Powers include flight, hurricane-force winds from the wings, and emitting explosive golden powder.
Hannya: Appears in episode 37. Powers include invisibility, levitation, red energy balls from the eyes on the torso skull, a katana, four capture cables in each wrist, and a flamethrower in the torso skull mouth.
Shogun: Appears in episode 38. Powers include burrowing and a pair of katanas stored on the back. Reappears in Brave Saga.
Margarita: Appears in episode 39. Powers include speed and boar tusks.
Pression: Appears in episode 40. Powers include fast swimming and a high pressure hose in the tail and mouth.
Atlas Mark II: Appear in episode 41. Powers include morphing into a jet, a beam glaive, a pair of beam tomahawks, and a beam sword. They appear in Brave Saga. The design was originally from Dai Atlas from Transformers Zone.
Raigo: Appears in episode 42. Powers include flight and powering Raijin and Jinrai's interference.
Raijin: Appears in episode 42. Powers include flight, kung fu skills, emitting an interference signal, an electric tentacle in the right wrist, nunchucks, and sais.
Jinrai: Appears in episode 42. Powers include flight, kung fu skills, emitting an interference signal, an electric tentacle in the right wrist, and a trident.

Black Noir's Forces
Black Noir: Appears throughout the series starting in episode 41. Powers include baptizing machines in a dark light that causes them to mutate, emitting red energy bolts, a giant floating fortress with regenerative properties, and wind-like shockwaves. It is revealed that he is from the "3rd dimension", and the world Brave Express Might Gaine takes place in is a game called the "2nd dimension". Black Noir called the show's characters game pieces, but later finds out he was tricked into being the game's final boss.
Z: Appear in episodes 43, 45, and 46. Powers include a forehead beam, flight, regeneration, a broadsword the fires blue energy beams, a high resistance to energy based attacks, and a red energy field.
Y: Appear in episodes 44, 45, 46, and 47. Powers include flight, an energy rifle, and regeneration..
X: Appear in episodes 44, 45, and 46. Powers include an assault rifle, a red energy field, and regeneration.
Blanca: Appears in episodes 45 and 46. Powers include flight and a force field.
Imperial: Appears in episode 47. Powers include a highly explosive red torso beam that is stronger than the Perfect Cannon, flight, an electrical field, a high resistance to energy attacks, a broadsword, and pink energy blasts from the mouth. Reappears in Brave Saga.

Video games
Might Gaine was adapted in the Brave Saga games like all other Braves entries, and was one of the series adapted in New Century Brave Wars. It was also adapted into Super Robot Wars V for the PlayStation 4 and PlayStation Vita, featuring every member of the Brave Express Team as playable characters although the individual bombers and dividers only appeared in cutscenes. Black Might Gaine is also a secret. In good faith to the show Black Noir is featured in the penultimate battle, revealing to be the author of every major conflict including incidents from other anime, and teams up with the Emperor of Darkness from Mazinger Edition Z: The Impact!. Unlike the series Black Noir is speculated by other protagonists to be a creation from a technologically advanced civilization that thought too highly of himself. Might Gaine is also featured in the spiritual follow up Super Robot Wars X on the same systems & Super Robot Wars T.

References
Japan Hero https://web.archive.org/web/20100107233806/http://japanhero.com/profiles/might_gaine_profileL.htm

External links 
 勇者特急マイトガイン (Official site)
 

1993 anime television series debuts
Sunrise (company)
Brave series
Super robot anime and manga
Super Robot Wars
Fictional trains